Barum is a municipality in the district of Lüneburg, in Lower Saxony, Germany. Barum has an area of 9.8 km² and a population of 1,844 (as of December 31, 2007). Barum is subdivided into the parts Barum, Horburg and St. Dionys. Barum is crossed by the river Neetze.

References

Lüneburg (district)